The 1998 FIFA World Cup European Qualification Playoffs were a set of home-and-away playoffs to decide the final four places granted to national football teams from European nations (more precisely, UEFA members) for the 1998 FIFA World Cup.

By the rules of the UEFA qualifying tournament, the first-place finishers in each of the nine groups received automatic berths, along with the best second-place team that had earned the most points against the top four teams in their individual group.

The eight remaining second-place teams were competed in this round: An open draw was held on 13 October 1997 at FIFA headquarters in Zürich.

The playoffs were decided by the standard FIFA method of aggregate score, with away goals and, if necessary, extra time with the possibility of a penalty shootout at the end of the second leg. The winner of each playoff was awarded a place in the 1998 FIFA World Cup.

Matches 

|}

First leg

Second leg 

Yugoslavia won 12–1 on aggregate.

Croatia won 3–1 on aggregate.

Belgium won 3–2 on aggregate.

Italy won 2–1 on aggregate.

Playoff UEFA
Qual
1997–98 in Republic of Ireland association football
1997–98 in Hungarian football
Qual
1997 in Russian football
Qual
1997–98 in Ukrainian football
Qual